Mayo Hospital is one of the oldest and biggest hospitals in Lahore, Punjab, Pakistan. King Edward Medical University, one of the oldest and most prestigious medical institutions in South Asia, is attached to Mayo Hospital. Mayo Hospital is located in the heart of Old Lahore, and provides free treatment to almost all admitted patients as part of a government policy. It also has many different ward's mainly centered around the Syed A route location.

History

The hospital building was completed in 1870 at a cost of Rs 150'000, 3 Annas 8 Paisas and it began operating in 1871. The hospital is named after then Viceroy of British India, "Richard Bourke, 6th Earl of Mayo" also locally known as Lord Mayo. This hospital was to serve need of 70'000 people of Punjab at that time. The hospital started with 3 specialties (General Medicine, General Surgery, Eye & Ent). The architecture of the hospital is Italian, designed by Pudon and engineered by Rai Bahadur Kanahya Lal, one of the leading architects of that time. However the architectural influence resembles medieval hospitals built during the Middle Ages. The additions between 1960 and early 1980 were designed by A. R. Hye. The main building of the hospital is one of the oldest buildings of British Era in Pakistan.

The hospital buildings were built in the following order:

Main Building of Mayo Hospital (Now inpatient department) in 1871
AVH (Private) Block in 1891
Out Patient Department in 1952
Pediatrics Ward in 1974
Institute of Ophthalmology in 1982
Accidents & Emergency Block & Pediatric Surgery Block (present) in 1984
Department of Physical Medicine and Rehabilitation in 2001
Surgical Tower in 2018

Facilities Available

 Physiotherapy and Manual therapy on both indoor and outdoor basis
 Central Intensive Care Unit (ICU) with Central Oxygen and Suction System
 Standard Coronary Care Unit (CCU) Facilities
 Angiography, Angioplasty, Cardiac Bypass, Heart Valves Replacement and all sorts of Cardiac Operations and procedures
 Radio Isotope Cardiology, Thallium Scan, Echocardiography
 Spiral Computed Tomography, Color Doppler and Ultrasonography
 Renal Transplantation and Renal Hemodialysis
 Radiotherapy
 Latest Physiotherapy Equipment, Rehabilitation Center and Orthopedic Workshop
 Neuroangiography, Electromyography (EMG), Electroencephalography (EEG) and all kind of advanced Neurosurgical operations
 Operations of Plastic Surgery and cosmetology (Lip Augmentation, Rhinoplasty)
 Operations of Facio-maxillary, Jaw and Dental Surgery
 All kinds of Orthopedic Operations
 All kind of Eye and Otorhinolaryngology Operations
 Surgical Operations of all kind for neonates, children, young and old patients
 Radio Isotope Thyroid, Liver, Bone, Brain and other organs scanning, Hormonal Assays and Viral Markings
 Speech & Language Therapy
24/7 Emergency Head & Spine Trauma
Dedicated Deep Brain Stimulation (DBS) Clinic
Complete State of the Art Neurosurgery Services including Functional Neurosurgery Services (DBS, SCS)
Pakistan's biggest, state of the art burn unit in surgical tower

Departments

Accident and Emergency

The main emergency department treats adults and children 13 years of age and up. There are separate emergency facilities for children less than 13 years old: Pediatric Medicine and Pediatric Surgery.

Total Beds available: ~500
Patients seen per day in all Emergency departments (Adult and Pediatric): ~ 600 - 800

Facilities Available in Emergency Department

 24-hour in-house coverage by Consultant Physicians & Surgeons and prompt availability of care in varying specialties such as Orthopedic surgery, Neurosurgery, Anesthesiology, Emergency Medicine, Radiology, Internal Medicine, Oral and Maxillofacial surgery.
 Intensive care (ICU) & coronary care unit (CCU), fully equipped with central monitoring, central oxygen supply system, ventilators, defibrillators and enough stock of medicines
 A well equipped clinical laboratory, performing 1500–2000 tests daily.
 Sufficient stock of blood of all groups in blood bank.
 Ambulance service for transport of patients within.

Out-Patient Department

There are 42 out-patient departments comprising Medicine and Surgery and other sub-specialties.

Average patients per day in OPD: ~2000

Inpatient Department

Average surgeries performed per day: ~250
Total Beds: ~2399
Major Departments: 4 Internal Medicine and 4 General Surgical Departments.

Total patients seen per year are ~8,35,136: ~2,25,653 in the Emergency and ~6,09,483 in the Outpatient Department.

Achievements

Free Clinical Services:

Starting from 24 May 2003, following departments provide 100% free treatment (as long as the patient remains admitted in the hospital):

Accident & Emergency Department
Inpatient Departments of all Medical & Surgical Specialties
Out Patient Departments of all Medical & Surgical Specialties

Free Diagnostic Services:

All admitted patients are getting Free of Cost diagnostic Laboratory & Radiology Services.

Psychiatry department of Mayo Hospital Lahore designated status of Psycho trauma Center for Punjab Province:

The psychiatry department of Mayo Hospital Lahore has been designated status of Psycho trauma Center for province of Punjab by Prime Ministers National Advisory Council in the aftermath of killings at Army Public School, Peshawar killings in 2014. This center is created to conduct workshops on trauma, identify and train team of mental health professionals and develop modules for training. The department is being headed by Prof. Aftab Asif. The chief coordinator is Dr Ali Madeeh Hashmi. A technical expert committee has been made with prominent psychiatrists and psychologists from Punjab. The center held its first workshop for First responders team and trained professionals from 1122 rescue service, traffic police, and Punjab police officers in 'Psychological First Aid' on 17 Jan 2015. Next workshop was carried out on 7 Feb 2015. Media professionals from different genre were included and topics such as responsible reporting of terrorist activities, mental health problems faced by media personnel and the dynamics between government, media and terrorism highlighted the programme.

Neurosurgery Department Pioneers Spinal Cord Stimulation in Pakistan:

Pakistan's first Spinal Cord Stimulation surgery was done by Neurosurgery Department of King Edward Medical University / Mayo Hospital Lahore in August 2018. Medtronic Spinal Cord Stimulation (SCS) system was purchased via tender. The team included Professor Shahzad Shams (Chairman Neurosurgery King Edward Medical University / Mayo Hospital Lahore), Dr Muhammad Tariq (Asst Prof Neurosurgery King Edward Medical University, Lahore), Dr Ammar Anwer (Research Fellow ANFN-DBS Pakistan) and Dr Rupesh Jung Raut (R 3, Neurosurgery Department King Edward Medical University / Mayo Hospital Lahore). The patient was suffering from phantom limb syndrome and Medtronic Prime Advance™ SCS system was implanted bilaterally in cervical spine.

Organization

Medical Superintendent heads the Hospital Management.

References

External links
Official Website of Mayo Hospital, Lahore

Hospital buildings completed in 1870
Hospitals in Lahore
Hospitals established in 1871
King Edward Medical University
1871 establishments in India